"Kaisha" is the 77th episode of the HBO television drama series The Sopranos and the 12th episode of the sixth season. It served as the midseason finale to the first part of Season 6, which HBO broadcast in two parts. The episode was written by executive producer Terence Winter, series creator/executive producer David Chase and co-executive producer Matthew Weiner, and directed by longtime series director Alan Taylor, and originally aired in the United States on June 4, 2006. Its premiere garnered 8.9 million American viewers.

Starring
 James Gandolfini as Tony Soprano
 Lorraine Bracco as Dr. Jennifer Melfi 
 Edie Falco as Carmela Soprano
 Michael Imperioli as Christopher Moltisanti
 Dominic Chianese as Corrado Soprano, Jr.
 Steven Van Zandt as Silvio Dante
 Tony Sirico as Paulie Gualtieri
 Robert Iler as Anthony Soprano, Jr.
 Jamie-Lynn Sigler as Meadow Soprano*
 Aida Turturro as Janice Soprano Baccalieri
 Steve Schirripa as Bobby Baccalieri
 Frank Vincent as Phil Leotardo
 Ray Abruzzo as Little Carmine Lupertazzi
* = credit only

Guest starring

Synopsis
Carlo disposes of Fat Dom's head in a sewer drain in Connecticut, while Benny blows up Phil's wire room. By chance, Phil is walking towards the place with a woman when it explodes, and they are blown onto their backs.

At a sit-down mediated by Little Carmine, Phil and Tony agree to end hostilities. However, it falls apart when Carmine thoughtlessly mentions Phil's murdered brother Billy; Phil, enraged, insults Tony and Carmine before storming off. Phil then discusses his next step with his capos Gerry, Butchie DeConcini, and Albie Cianflone. When Phil rejects Butchie's suggestion to kill Tony, Butchie suggests picking "somebody over there." Later, Agent Harris quietly tells Tony that his sources in the FBI are saying that someone in his organization may be in danger of retaliation by the Lupertazzi family.

Phil has a heart attack. At first, Tony is elated but later surprises the New York mobsters by visiting Phil at the hospital. Tony tells Phil what he learned from his coma; tells him to take his time recovering and enjoy his grandchildren and the good things in life, and says that later there will be enough for everyone. Phil is left emotional by the scene, breaking down in tears.

Tony completes the Jamba Juice deal and tries to revive his relationship with Julianna, only to learn that she is now Christopher's lover, having met him at an AA meeting. The two relapse into drug use, telling themselves that they can integrate the drugs into their lives. Chris tells Tony and the crew he is seeing a black girl named Kaisha, who he prefers not to introduce to them. Eventually, he tells Tony the truth in order to prevent him from finding out that he is using drugs again. Tony acts indifferent, but to Dr. Melfi he expresses his anger that his reward for marital fidelity is Chris's relationship with the woman he desired for himself.

Carmela is thinking about Adriana again because of her dream in Paris, and because her mother, Liz La Cerva, has tried to kill herself in despair. Carmela wants Tony to hire a private investigator to track Adriana down; he tells Silvio to lean on the building inspector so that she can work again on the spec house. When the stop order is lifted, Carmela immediately realizes that it is Tony's work and thanks him profusely. She throws away the detective agency's business card.

At the construction site, A.J. meets Blanca Selgado, a Hispanic woman who works in the office. On their first date, while they watch television in her apartment and her infant son Hector sleeps, a group of youths begin playing loud music outside. She says her ex-boyfriend used to beat the youths. A.J. resolves the dispute by bribing them with an expensive mountain bike given by his parents. Afterward, A.J. and Blanca make love.

The Baccalieris, DeAngelis, and Moltisantis join the Sopranos at their home for Christmas Eve, although Meadow has stayed in California. A.J. arrives with Blanca and Hector. His parents welcome her but, aside, murmur their reservations. Carmela takes Tony's hand; the Christmas tree is piled high with gifts; Christmas music is playing; almost the entire extended family is gathered, it seems, peacefully.

First appearances
 Blanca Selgado: A.J.'s new Dominican girlfriend.
 Butch DeConcini: a Lupertazzi family capo who is in favor of most aggressive action against the Jersey crime family, such as the murder of someone close to Tony or Tony himself.

Title reference
 The episode's title, "Kaisha," is the name of Christopher's imaginary black comàre.
  In "Whitecaps", Credenzo Curtis, Chris' former heroin dealer mentioned his ex, "Kaisha", right before he was assassinated after the hit on Carmine Lupertazzi was called off.

Production
 "Sentimental Journey" was the working title for this episode.
 The episode is dedicated to the director John Patterson, who directed every season finale for the first five seasons and worked regularly on the series, but died after its fifth season.
 The exploding storefront is an actual location in the Queens neighborhood of Ridgewood on Fresh Pond Road (one of the two main local shopping streets).

Other cultural references
 When Benny calls Tony to confirm the destruction of Phil's wireroom, he refers to Phil as "the Shah" due to his resemblance to the deposed Shah of Iran.
 Christopher's comments about penguins spending a long time guarding an egg only to lose the chick inside refers to the documentary film March of the Penguins.
 During his sit-down with Tony, Phil notes the disappearance of "Fat Dom" Gamiello and surmises that the Soprano family killed him because Dom was last seen in Jersey. Tony denies that claim and adds: "So was the Hindenburg," referring to the disaster which took place in Lakehurst, New Jersey.
 Phil and Butch believe Tony killed Dom in retaliation for Phil's murder of Vito.  Butch compares this to 9/11—Tony now has their attention, and it is time to defeat him.
 Patty Leotardo calls the irritable Phil Ebenezer Scrooge when discussing Christmas dinner with him.
 Julianna questions Christopher's intention to title his film Cleaver because of the possibility that people will think of Beaver Cleaver (Leave It to Beaver TV show).
 Christopher mentions Saw and Hostel as examples of successful one-word horror movie titles.
 A.J. and Blanca are watching the comedy film The 40-Year-Old Virgin in her apartment before the noise outside wakes Hector up.
 A.J. gives the street punks making noise outside Blanca's place a Gary Fisher mountain bike. 
 Blanca says A.J. was born on the same day as Jesse Ventura, a "politician."
 Christopher and Julianna are watching Hitchcock's Vertigo at a movie theater after smoking heroin in his car.
 In what appears to be a joke towards writer Terence Winter, Christopher mentions that the "50 Cent movie" aka Get Rich or Die Tryin' was being given away free at the car wash. Winter wrote the script for that film and co-wrote this episode.
 Christopher tells Tony he told Julianna to buy a Luther Vandross boxed set for Kaisha for her birthday.
 Christopher mentions The Jerry Springer Show when he walks and talks about his AA meetings. He tells "Murmur" that there is nothing but "white trash and narcotics" who talk about their problems, he recalls it as a "Fucking Jerry Springer Show!"
 Junior references the JFK assassination to Bobby Bacala when he says he "didn't act alone" in the shooting of Tony.
 Carmela says the Christmas toy drive charity she participated in gave away an Xbox video game system.
 Bobby Jr. watches the film A Christmas Carol on TV before starting to flip through channels. Scrooge was previously featured in the season 5 episode "The Test Dream."
 Bobby Jr. is later prominently watching Casablanca.

Music
 The episode opens and closes with The Rolling Stones song "Moonlight Mile."
 "Precious" by The Pretenders plays when A.J. gets Blanca's phone number at the bar.
 The three street youths play the Latin hip-hop songs "Culo" and "Toma" by Pitbull.
 The opening theme music to Alfred Hitchcock's Vertigo by Bernard Herrmann is played during the montage of Chris and Julianna using heroin again and watching the movie at the theater.
 The song playing at the Bada Bing! when Tony learns of Phil's heart attack is a version of "The Little Drummer Boy" by Joan Jett and the Blackhearts.
 Frank Sinatra's "The Christmas Waltz" as well as his version of "Silent Night" is playing during the episode's final moments.

References

External links
"Kaisha"  at HBO

The Sopranos (season 6) episodes
American Christmas television episodes
2006 American television episodes
Television episodes written by David Chase
Television episodes written by Terence Winter